Lesley Ferkins is a New Zealand sports management academic and professor in the School of Sport and Recreation at Auckland University of Technology.

Academic career 
Ferkins graduated with an MA in recreation and leisure studies from Victoria University of Wellington in 1992. After a PhD titled Sport Governance: Developing strategic capability in national sport organisations at Deakin University, where she also worked as senior lecturer, Ferkins returned to New Zealand as associate professor at Unitec Institute of Technology. In 2015 she moved to Auckland University of Technology as associate professor, rising to full professor in 2018.

Selected works

References

External links 

 
 
 
 

Living people
Year of birth missing (living people)
New Zealand women academics
Victoria University of Wellington alumni
Deakin University alumni
Academic staff of Deakin University
Academic staff of Unitec Institute of Technology
Academic staff of the Auckland University of Technology